The 2010 Brent London Borough Council  election took place on 6 May 2010 to elect members of Brent London Borough Council in London, England. The whole council was up for election and the Labour Party gained overall control of the council from no overall control.

Background
After the last election in 2006 the Liberal Democrats were the largest party with 27 councillors, compared to 21 for Labour and 15 for the Conservatives. However between 2006 and 2010 there were a number of changes in the party composition, with firstly in 2007 a councillor for Kensal Green, Berth Joseph defecting from Labour to the Conservatives. Joseph, after having been suspended from the council for 6 months in 2009, would go to contest the 2010 election as an independent.

Meanwhile, in 2009 a second Labour councillor, Francis Eniola of Welsh Harp ward, also defected to the Conservatives. The Conservatives meanwhile had lost 2 councillors in 2008 when Queensbury councillors Robert Dunwell and Atiq Malik left the party to form their own Democratic Conservative Group.

Labour aimed to regain control of the council in 2010 and targeted the wards of Dollis Hill, Kilburn, Queensbury, Tokyngton and Willesden, while also fighting to hold Fryent ward. Since 2006 the council had been controlled by a coalition between the Liberal Democrats and Conservatives.

Election result
Labour gained control of the council after making a net gain of 19 seats from both the Liberal Democrats and Conservatives. This took Labour to 40 seats, while the Liberal Democrats dropped to 17 seats and the Conservatives were reduced to 6 seats.

|}

Ward results

References

2010
2010 London Borough council elections
May 2010 events in the United Kingdom